Portnow is a surname. Notable people with the surname include:

Andrii Portnov (born 1979), Ukrainian historian
James Portnow, American writer and game designer
Neil Portnow, American music industry executive
Richard Portnow (born 1947), American actor

See also
Portnoy